A Man the Army Made is a 1917 British silent war drama film directed by Bertram Phillips and starring Queenie Thomas, Paul R. Hall and H. Agar Lyons.

Cast
 Queenie Thomas as Queenie Clarke  
 Corporal Paul R. Hall as Dick Clarke 
 H. Agar Lyons as Irwin Lockwood 
 Mickey Brantford as Derry Clarke

References

Bibliography
 Low, Rachael. History of the British Film, 1914-1918. Routledge, 2005.

External links

1917 films
1910s war drama films
British war drama films
British silent feature films
Films directed by Bertram Phillips
British World War I films
British black-and-white films
1917 drama films
1910s English-language films
1910s British films
Silent war drama films